War in a Rack is a 2009 EP by Soweto Kinch.

Track listing
All tracks are written by Soweto Kinch.

 War in a Rack Intro (0:56)
 Can't Hold Me Down (3:31)
 B**ch Slap (2:24)
 Declaration of War (3:47)
 Head for the Hills (3:36)
 Sound the Alert (3:06)

Personnel
 Soweto Kinch
 Francis Mott
 C4sey
 Tumi
 Verbal Kent

References

2009 EPs
Soweto Kinch EPs